Salazarese (locally Zaraitzuko uskara) is the Basque dialect of the Salazar Valley of Navarre, Spain.

In English it is also known as Zaraitzu Basque, the Zaraitzu dialect or Salazar dialect; in Spanish as salacenco and in Basque as Zaraitzuko euskara.

Basque was spoken in the Salazar valley until the first half of the 20th century; ever since, the number of speakers started a dramatic decline. At the time of the 2002 linguistic census, there were only two native speakers, both with ages over 85, and within a few years Salazarese became extinct. However, its features had been documented over the 19th and 20th centuries.

From the 1980s there has been a revival of the Basque language in Spain. As a result, roughly a quarter of the valley's inhabitants now speak Standard Basque. It would be possible to revive the Salazarese dialect to some degree by teaching its features to Batua speakers.

History

18th century 

Some religious texts were written: the Christian doctrines of Itzalle and Orontze and texts published by Satrustegi.

19th century 
 
Apart from more religious texts, there is a wealth of significant research work by Louis-Lucien Bonaparte.

Pedro Jose Sanper translated the Gospel of Matthew. and Jose Urrutia undertook the translation of Arturo Campion's “Orreaga”.

20th century 

Ziriako and Federiko Garralda wrote several articles in the magazine "Euskal Esnalea" in the local Basque of Zaraitzu between the years 1911 and 1925, covering different subjects: tales, riddles, passages, local history, veterinary science, traditions and games for children. 
Azkue collected several proverbs and tales in Zaraitzu Basque in his works of Basque folklore and ethnography. Also he collected a significant amount of local words in his dictionary. 
Koldo Mitxelena studied thoroughly the dialect from 1958 onwards. 
Jose Estornes Lasa collected the stories and passages of Zoilo Moso in 1969. 
Koldo Artola has published the audio recordings that he taped between 1975 and 2003 in Zaraitzu.

21st century 

Aitor Arana has collected the testimonies of Basque-speakers of Zaraitzu, published a dictionary of the dialect in 2001, and next year a book of grammar. In 2004 he published a collection of texts and he gave some curses of the local Basque in the Valley. The work of the researcher Inaki Camino should be mentioned as well.

Text

References

Basque dialects